Things I Do for Money is a 2019 Canadian crime film, directed by Warren P. Sonoda. The film stars Theodor Aoki and Maximilian Aoki as two cello-playing brothers in Hamilton, Ontario, who become embroiled in the criminal underworld when a bag of money belonging to a criminal hitman accidentally ends up in their possession.

The film was the first-ever acting role for both Theodor and Maximilian Aoki, real-life sibling cellists from Hamilton who also composed the film's score. Their father, Edward Aoki, also has a supporting role in the film as another hitman; the film's cast also includes Yodit Tewoderos, Rhett Morita, Jennifer Lynn Walton, Dax Lough, Danilo Reyes, Colette Zacca and Ali Kazmi.

The film's soundtrack includes a cello-based re-recording by Jay Semko of "Things I Do for Money", a 1987 single by Semko's band The Northern Pikes.

The film premiered at the Whistler Film Festival in 2019, and was commercially released to video on demand platforms in August 2020 after its planned theatrical release was scuttled by the COVID-19 pandemic in Canada. The film did, however, receive a special theatrical drive-in screening in Hamilton on July 22, 2020.

Faustine Pelipel received a nomination for Best Sound Editing in a Feature Film at the 2020 Directors Guild of Canada awards.

References

External links
 

2019 films
2019 crime drama films
Canadian crime drama films
English-language Canadian films
Films shot in Hamilton, Ontario
Films set in Ontario
Films directed by Warren P. Sonoda
Films about Japanese Canadians
2010s English-language films
2010s Canadian films